Suessenguthiella is a genus of plant in family Molluginaceae.

Selected species
The genus contains the following species (but this list may be incomplete):
 Suessenguthiella caespitosa Friedrich
 Suessenguthiella scleranthoides (Sond.) Friedrich

Molluginaceae
Taxonomy articles created by Polbot